Rebecca Conrad Young (February 28, 1934 – November 18, 2008) was a Wisconsin politician and legislator.

Born in Clairton, Pennsylvania, Young graduated from University of Michigan. She received her law degree from University of Wisconsin–Madison in 1983. Young served on the Dane County, Wisconsin Board of Supervisors, and the Madison, Wisconsin School Board. Young also served in the Wisconsin State Assembly from 1985 to 1997.

Young was diagnosed with cancer in 1997, forcing her to retire from her political career, and she died at her home in Madison in 2008.

Notes

People from Clairton, Pennsylvania
Politicians from Madison, Wisconsin
University of Michigan alumni
University of Wisconsin Law School alumni
Members of the Wisconsin State Assembly
Women state legislators in Wisconsin
County supervisors in Wisconsin
School board members in Wisconsin
1934 births
2008 deaths
20th-century American women politicians
Lawyers from Madison, Wisconsin
20th-century American lawyers
20th-century American politicians
21st-century American women